Guy Edward Kelly (May 23, 1876 – July 28, 1940) was an American politician in the state of Washington who served in the Washington House of Representatives. Between 1917 and 1919, and was speaker of the house.

References

Republican Party members of the Washington House of Representatives
1876 births
1940 deaths